Puget Sound Naval Shipyard, officially Puget Sound Naval Shipyard and  Intermediate Maintenance Facility (PSNS & IMF), is a United States Navy shipyard covering 179 acres (0.7 km2) on Puget Sound at Bremerton, Washington in uninterrupted use since its establishment in 1891; it has also been known as Navy Yard Puget Sound, Bremerton Navy Yard, and the Bremerton Naval Complex.

It is bordered on the south by Sinclair Inlet, on the west by the Bremerton Annex of Naval Base Kitsap, and on the north and east by the city of Bremerton, Washington. It is the Pacific Northwest's largest naval shore facility and one of Washington state's largest industrial installations. PSNS & IMF provides the Navy with maintenance, modernization, and technical and logistics support, and employs 14,000 people.

History

Puget Sound Naval Shipyard was established in 1891 as a Naval Station and was designated Navy Yard Puget Sound in 1901. During World War I, the Navy Yard constructed ships, including 25 subchasers, seven submarines, two minesweepers, seven seagoing tugs, and two ammunition ships, as well as 1,700 small boats. During World War II, the shipyard's primary effort was the repair of battle damage to ships of the U.S. fleet and those of its allies.

Following World War II, Navy Yard Puget Sound was designated Puget Sound Naval Shipyard. It engaged in an extensive program of modernizing carriers, including converting conventional flight decks to angle decks. During the Korean War, the shipyard was engaged in the activation of ships. In the late 1950s, it entered an era of new construction with the building of a new class of guided missile frigates. In 1965, USS Sculpin (SSN 590) became the first nuclear-powered submarine to be maintained at PSNS. The shipyard was designated a National Historic Landmark in 1992.  The historic district includes 22 contributing buildings and 42 contributing structures, as well as 49 non-contributing buildings, structures, and objects.

Installations
Perhaps the most visible feature of the shipyard is its green hammerhead crane, built in 1933.

Historic districts
The Puget Sound Naval Shipyard contains five historic districts:

Officers' Row Historic District;
Puget Sound Radio Station Historic District;
Hospital Reservation Historic District;
Puget Sound Naval Shipyard Historic District; and
Marine Reservation Historic District.

These five units are a comprehensive representation of the historic features of the naval shipyard.

Dry Docks and Slipways

Operations

Shipbuilding

 Heavy cruisers
 1 of 6  (built July 1928 - September 1930)
 
 1 of 7  (September 1930 - December 1933)
 
 Destroyers
 1 of 8  (built December 1932 - October 1934)
 
 2 of 18  (August 1934 - December 1935)
 
 
 2 of 8  (July 1935 - May 1937)
 
 
 1 of 8  (March 1937 - April 1939)
 
 1 of 30  (January 1939 - May 1940)
 
 1 of 66  (July 1939 - May 1940)
 
 8 of 175  (June 1941 - September 1944)
 
 
 
 
 
 
 
 

 8 of 65 s (September 1942 - August 1943)
  ...

Ship-Submarine Recycling Program

In 1990 the Navy authorized the Ship-Submarine Recycling Program (SRP) to recycle nuclear-powered ships at PSNS. Approximately 25% of the shipyard's workload involves inactivation, reactor compartment disposal, and recycling of ships. It has pioneered an environmentally safe method of deactivating and recycling nuclear-powered ships. This process places the U.S. Navy in the role of being the world's only organization to design, build, operate, and recycle nuclear-powered ships. On 15 May 2003 PSNS and IMF were consolidated into what is now known as PSNS & IMF.

PSNS is the only U.S. facility certified to recycle nuclear ships. During all this period Puget Sound Naval Shipyard has scrapped more than 125 submarines and some cruisers.

Reserve fleet
The shipyard contains a portion of the United States Navy reserve fleet, a large collection of inactive U.S. Navy vessels, including the aircraft carrier . Kitty Hawk was mothballed, meaning that she was stored in case she was needed by the Navy in the future. On 6 October 2021, Kitty Hawk was sold for one cent to International Shipbreaking Limited.

Environmental issues
Gorst Creek Ravine near Port Orchard, Washington was a hazardous waste dump for the Navy's shipyard waste between 1969 and 1970, when the site was not permitted by local authorities to take waste. After several collapses since 1997 the landfill could blow out Highway 3. The landfill is an "ongoing source of pesticides, polychlorinated biphenyls and metals flowing downstream with the potential to affect groundwater wells, sport fisheries and the Suquamish Tribe's fish hatchery. In October 2014, the US EPA ordered the Navy to fix the problems.

Gallery

See also
List of U.S. National Historic Landmark ships, shipwrecks, and shipyards

Notes

External links

Puget Sound Naval Shipyard & Intermediate Maintenance Facility
Historic American Engineering Record (HAER) documentation, filed under Bremerton, Kitsap County, WA:

Naval installations in Washington (state)
Bremerton, Washington
Transportation buildings and structures in Kitsap County, Washington
Historic American Engineering Record in Washington (state)
Historic districts on the National Register of Historic Places in Washington (state)
National Historic Landmarks in Washington (state)
United States Navy shipyards
Superfund sites in Washington (state)
Military Superfund sites
Puget Sound
Military facilities on the National Register of Historic Places in Washington (state)
National Register of Historic Places in Kitsap County, Washington
Shipyards on the National Register of Historic Places
1891 establishments in Washington (state)
Shipyards building World War II warships